Krypto the Superdog is an American animated television series produced by Warner Bros. Animation, based on Superman's canine companion Krypto, which premiered on Cartoon Network on March 25, 2005 (exactly 50 years after his comic debut), and aired on The CW's Saturday morning block Kids' WB from September 23, 2006 until September 15, 2007. 39 episodes were produced.

A comic book series (based on the TV show) was published by DC Comics under the Johnny DC imprint, which lasted 6 issues, from 2006 to 2007.

The show was developed by producers Alan Burnett and Paul Dini, who had produced the successful Batman: The Animated Series and Superman: The Animated Series. Instead of continuing in that style, Krypto was produced in a manner reminiscent of the Hanna-Barbera shows of the 1960s to the 1980s, from the sound effects down to the animation style (veteran Hanna-Barbera designer Iwao Takamoto served as a creative consultant).

Plot

As the planet Krypton is about to be destroyed, Superman's father Jor-El makes a ship and puts a white puppy named Krypto into it for a test flight to see if it is safe enough for interstellar travel. While aboard the ship, Krypto was playing with his ball when he accidentally destroyed several wires and causes the ship to release a sleeping gas to put him into a deep sleep while it heads on to Earth. When he arrived in Earth's solar system he woke up and found himself fully grown. The rocket's computer system gave him a collar and an ID with an intergalactic communicator.

Upon landing on Earth, Krypto is a full-grown dog, possessed of superpowers similar to those of Superman's (since all Kryptonian life-forms gain superpowers from exposure to a yellow sun, such as Earth's sun). Later, he is adopted by Kevin Whitney, a 9-year-old boy, with whom Superman arranges for him to stay (as Superman himself is often too busy saving the world to take care of him). Krypto poses as an ordinary dog while living with Kevin's family, but adopts the secret identity of Krypto the Superdog for his superheroic deeds; Kevin is aware of Krypto's dual identity, but the rest of Kevin's family is not (excluding Kevin's spoiled cousin Bailey, who found out accidentally). Kevin lives next door to Andrea, a girl who takes care of Krypto's best friend, Streaky.

In the series, the various animals, including Krypto, all are capable of speaking to each other, but not to humans, except for Kevin and later Andrea (they are able to communicate with Krypto and the other animals thanks to a universal translator that they wear, known as an intergalactic communicator). The viewers can understand them, though, especially when Krypto and Streaky talk to the camera.

With his allies Streaky the Supercat, Ace the Bat-Hound, and Stretch-O-Mutt, Krypto fights the plots of Lex Luthor's pet iguana Ignatius, Joker's pet hyenas Bud and Lou, Penguin's trained birds called the Bad News Birds, and Catwoman's cat Isis. When working with a group of alien dog superheroes known as the Dog Star Patrol, Krypto faces off against the evil Mechanikat and his agents Snooky Wookums and Delilah.

Episodes

Voice cast

 Samuel Vincent − Krypto the Superdog
 Brian Drummond − Streaky the Supercat, Edward 'Eddy' Whitney (Kevin's father)
 Scott McNeil − Ace the Bat-Hound, Ignatius, Mertin the Magnificent, Super-Flea
 Ellen Kennedy − Brainy Barker
 Kelly Sheridan − Mammoth Mutt
 Michael Dobson − Bull Dog
 Dale Wilson − Paw Pooch, Artie
 Peter Kelamis − Tail Terrier
 Terry Klassen − Tusky Husky, Waddles
 Trevor Devall − Hot Dog
 Lee Tockar − Stretch-O-Mutt
 David Paul Grove − Robbie the Robin
 Mark Oliver − Mechanikat
 Nicole Bouma − Snooky Wookums
 Alberto Ghisi − Kevin Whitney 
 Tabitha St. Germain − Andrea Sussman, Melanie Whitney  
 Nicole Oliver − Mary Whitney (Kevin's mother)
 Michael Daingerfield − Kal-El/Clark Kent/Superman
 Brian Dobson − Lex Luthor
 Kathleen Barr - Isis, Delilah
 Matt Hill - Griff 
 Ty Olsson - Drooly

Additional voices

Kathleen Barr
Noel Callahan
Louis Chirillo
Phil Hayes
Mark Hildreth
Matt Hill
Pam Hyatt
Danny McKinnon
Colin Murdock
Ty Olsson
Russell Roberts
Alvin Sanders
Reece Thompson
French Tickner
David "Squatch" Ward
Cathy Weseluck

Ending and broadcast reruns
On December 15, 2006, the series ended. Reruns were shown on Kids' WB as part of the then-new CW network's E/I requirement, but stopped airing due to Kids' WB opting to use Cookie Jar Entertainment's shows Will & Dewitt and Magi-Nation. Krypto was aired on Boomerang from February 5, 2007 for a duration of 7 years until January 3, 2014. The two-part holiday special, "Iguanukkah", aired on Cartoon Network, December 21, 2008 (as well as Christmas Eve and Christmas Day), as part of the all-day holiday specials marathon. It was shown on Boomerang.
Overseas, the show currently airs on Boomerang in Australia and on France 3 (as part of Ludo) in France. The show began airing on Boomerang Latin America in 2014. In the UK & Ireland, the series, upon starting, aired on the CBBC Channel before later moving to Cartoonito. However, as of November 2017, it appears to be no longer broadcast on that channel. Since September 2018, It started airing reruns on Tooncast in Latin America.

Home media
Warner Home Video released two DVD volumes in 2006 - each featured a few episodes from the first season; no further releases took place until it was announced that the complete series would be released on DVD on September 27, 2022. The series was recently added alongside other DC animated shows onto HBO Max, but currently only in Latin America.

References

External links

2005 American television series debuts
2006 American television series endings
2000s American animated television series
2000s American superhero comedy television series
American children's animated action television series
American children's animated adventure television series
American children's animated comic science fiction television series
American children's animated science fantasy television series
American children's animated superhero television series
Animated Superman television series
Animated television shows based on DC Comics
Animated television series about dogs
Cartoon Network original programming
English-language television shows
Kids' WB original shows
Cartoonito original programming
Television series by Warner Bros. Animation